Epictia is a genus of snakes in the family Leptotyphlopidae. The genus is native to South America, Central America, and Mexico.

Taxonomy
Prior to 2009 all species of Epictia were placed in the genus Leptotyphlops.

Species
The genus Epictia contains the following 44 species which are recognized as being valid:
Epictia albifrons 
Epictia albipuncta 
Epictia alfredschmidti 
Epictia amazonica 
Epictia antoniogarciai 
Epictia ater 
Epictia australis  – Freiberg's blind snake
Epictia bakewelli  – Bakewell's blind snake
Epictia borapeliotes 
Epictia clinorostris 
Epictia columbi  – San Salvador blind snake 
Epictia diaplocia  – common Peru blind snake
Epictia fallax 
Epictia goudotii 
Epictia guayaquilensis 
Epictia hobartsmithi 
Epictia magnamaculata 
Epictia martinezi 
Epictia melanura  – dark blind snake
Epictia munoai  – Rio Grande do Sul blind snake
Epictia pauldwyeri 
Epictia peruviana  – Peru blind snake
Epictia phenops 
Epictia resetari 
Epictia rioignis 
Epictia rubrolineata  – red-lined blind snake
Epictia rufidorsa  – rose blind snake
Epictia schneideri 
Epictia septemlineata 
Epictia signata 
Epictia striatula 
Epictia subcrotilla  – Klauber's blind snake
Epictia teaguei  – northern blind snake
Epictia tenella 
Epictia tesselata  – Tschudi's blind snake
Epictia tricolor  – three-colored blind snake
Epictia undecimstriata  – eleven-striped blind snake
Epictia unicolor 
Epictia vanwallachi 
Epictia vellardi 
Epictia venegasi 
Epictia vindumi 
Epictia vonmayi 
Epictia wynni 

Nota bene: A binomial authority in parentheses indicates that the species was originally described in a genus other than Epictia.

References

Further reading
Adalsteinsson SA, Branch WR, Trape S, Vitt LJ, Hedges SB (2009). "Molecular phylogeny, classification, and biogeography of snakes of the family Leptotyphlopidae (Reptilia, Squamata)". Zootaxa 2244: 1–50. (Resurrection of genus Epictia, Gray, 1845, p. 16).
Gray JE (1845). Catalogue of the Specimens of Lizards in the Collection of the British Museum. London: Trustees of the British Museum. (Edward Newman, printer). xxviii + 289 pp. (Epictia, new genus, pp. 139–140).

 
Snake genera
Taxa named by John Edward Gray